In linguistic typology, split ergativity is a feature of certain languages where some constructions use ergative syntax and morphology, but other constructions show another pattern, usually nominative–accusative. The conditions in which ergative constructions are used varies among different languages.

Nominative–accusative vs. ergative–absolutive

Nominative–accusative languages (including European languages, with the notable exception of Basque) treat both the actor in a clause with a transitive verb and the experiencer in a clause with an intransitive verb in the same way grammatically. If the language uses case markers, they take the same case. If it uses word order, it is parallel.

For example, consider these two English sentences:
 Jane was chasing John.
 Jane was sweating.

The grammatical role of "Jane" is identical. In both cases, "Jane" is the subject.

In ergative–absolutive languages (such as Basque and Georgian, or the Eskimo–Aleut and Mayan languages), there is a different pattern. The patient (or target) of a transitive verb and the experiencer of an intransitive verb are treated the same grammatically. If the two sentences above were expressed in an ergative language, "John" in the former and "Jane" in the latter would be parallel grammatically. Also, a different form (the ergative) would be used for "Jane" in the first sentence.

For example, in the following Inuktitut sentences, the subject 'the woman' is in ergative case (arnaup) when occurring with a transitive verb, while the object 'the apple' (aapu) is in absolutive case. In the intransitive sentence, the subject 'the woman' arnaq is in absolutive case.
 Arnaup nirijanga aapu. 'The woman is eating the apple.'
 Arnaq pisuktuq. 'The woman is walking.'

In split ergative languages, some constructions pattern with nominative–accusative, and others with ergative–absolutive.

Split conditions
The split is usually conditioned by one of the following:

 The presence of a discourse participant (a first or second person) in the proposition. The Australian language Dyirbal behaves ergatively in all morphosyntactic contexts unless one of those is involved. When a first- or second-person pronoun appears, however, it is marked according to a nominative–accusative pattern (with the least-marked case, when it is the agent or intransitive, or with the most marked case, when it is the patient). That can be explained in terms of the high animacy of a first-person or second-person speaker in the animacy hierarchy.
 The use of certain aspects and/or tenses in the verb. The Indo-Iranian family, for example, shows a split between the perfective and the imperfective aspect. In Hindustani (Hindi-Urdu), a transitive verb in the perfective aspect causes its arguments to be marked by an ergative pattern, and the imperfective aspects trigger accusative marking.
 The type of marking involved. Some languages (including various Austronesian languages of New Guinea such as Sinaugoro) have an ergative–absolutive pattern with respect to the marking of case marking but a nominative–accusative pattern with respect to agreement.
 The agentivity of the intransitive subject.  In languages like Dakota, arguments of active verbs, such as to run, are marked like transitive agents, as in accusative languages, but arguments of inactive verbs, such as to stand are marked like transitive objects, as in ergative languages. Languages with such a marking are known as split-S languages and are formally a subtype of active languages.
 Pragmatic considerations or for emphasis, contrast, or clarity. In certain Tibeto-Burmese languages, elicited data has consistent ergative, aspectually split-ergative or active-stative case marking pattern, and in natural discourse the “ergative” marking is found only in some clauses, often a minority, usually with some pragmatic sense of emphasis or contrast (DeLancey, 2011).

Examples

Hindi–Urdu

An example of split ergativity conditioned by the grammatical aspect is found in Hindustani (Hindi-Urdu); in the perfective aspect of transitive verbs (in active voice), the subject takes ergative case and the direct object takes an unmarked absolutive case identical to the nominative case, which is sometimes called direct case. However, in all other aspects (habitual & progressive), subjects appear either in the direct/nominative case or dative case (see dative subjects), while direct objects continue to appear in the direct case (the subject of such sentences is differentiated from the direct object not from a difference in case but from the agreement of the verb with the subject as well as other syntactic and contextual cues such as word order and meaning).

In the following perfective sentence, the agent laṛke-ne (boy) is marked for ergative case, while the undergoer kitāb (book) is in unmarked nominative case. The verb kharīdī (bought) has the feminine ending -ī, showing gender agreement with the undergoer kitāb (book).

In the corresponding imperfective (habitual aspect) sentence, the agent laṛkā (boy) is in unmarked nominative case. The habitual participle form kharīdatā (buy) has the masculine ending -ā and thus agrees with the agent laṛkā (boy).

Perfective constructions with certain VV (verb-verb) complexes do not employ ergative case marking (seeː light verbs in hindi-urdu). In perfective constructions, the agent argument is ideally assigned with an ergative case; however in cases like the first example shown below that does not happen. This is because the explicator verb gayī (gone) which although undergoes semantic bleaching but still retains its intransitivity which does not allow for an ergative case assignment to the agent argument (i.e., ninā). This is why as shown in the second example below, VV complexes involving a transitive explicator verb (e.g., phẽkā "threw") can employ ergative case to agent arguments.

Chol (Mayan)
The Mayan language Chol has split-ergative person marking.

In transitive clauses, verbs are framed by a person marking prefix (called "set A" in Mayan linguistics) that expresses the subject, and a suffix that expresses the object (= "set B").

In intransitive clauses, the subject can either be represented by a set A-person marker, or a set B-person marker, depending on aspect.

In perfective aspect, Chol has ergative–absolutive alignment: the subject of the intransitive verb is expressed by a suffixed person marker, thus in the same way as the object of transitive verbs.

In imperfective aspect, Chol has nominative–accusative alignment: the subject of the intransitive verb is expressed by a prefixed person marker, thus in the same way as the subject of transitive verbs.

Sahaptin
In Columbia River Sahaptin, the split is determined by the person of both subject and object. The ergative suffix -nɨm occurs only for third-person subjects for which the direct object is in the first or the second person.

Another ergative suffix, -in, marks the subject in the inverse. Both subject and object are then always in the third-person.

Direct (same as above example):

Inverse:

Notes

Bibliography

 Dixon, R. M. W. (1994). Ergativity. Cambridge University Press. .

Grammar